Antoine de la Rochefoucauld, the second of this name, Seigneur de Chaumont-sur-Loire, served Louis I de Bourbon, prince de Condé as a knight (chevalier de l'ordre du Roi) and his chamberlain. On 7 October 1552, he married Cécile de Montmirail, daughter of Étienne de Montmirail, seigneur de Chambourcy, maître des requêtes and Louise de Selve.

He fought at the Battle of Jarnac on 13 March 1569, where the Prince de Condé was killed, and succeeded to withdraw his troops to Cognac. Charged by Gaspard de Coligny, he then took Nontron, 8 June.

See also
Duc de La Rochefoucauld

External links
List of notable members of the La Rochefoucauld family (in French)

French knights
16th-century French people
Military governors of Paris
Year of birth missing
Year of death missing